Natchitoches may refer to:

 Natchitoches people, an American Indian people
 Natchitoches meat pie

Places and jurisdictions 
 Natchitoches, Louisiana, a parish seat
 the former, now titular, Latin Catholic Roman Catholic Diocese of Natchitoches, with see in the above Louisiana town
 Natchitoches (YTB-799), a naval tugboat named for the parish Seat
 Natchitoches Parish, Louisiana
 Natchitoches Regional Airport

See also
Nacogdoches, Texas